Lepo se provedi (English: Have Fun) is the thirteenth studio album by the Serbian singer Indira Radić, released in 2007.

Track listing
Uzvodno od ljubavi
Lepo se provedi
Imali smo, nismo znali (duet with Alen Islamović)
Upaljač
Noćni program
Halo srce gde si
Ne dolaziš u obzir
Ljubavi mrtvorođene
Zavodnica
Hitna

References

2007 albums
Indira Radić albums
Grand Production albums